Car spotting is the observing or photographing of interesting, vintage, rare, modified and supercars on public roads.

Car spotting may also refer to:
Car spotting (service),  a railroad service
Car spotting (positioning), the precise positioning of a car